Kinsale is a town in Ireland.

Kinsale may also refer to:
 Kinsale, Ontario
 Kinsale, Virginia
 Kinsale, an abandoned settlement in the exclusion zone of Montserrat